Temple Emanu-El is a Conservative synagogue in Port Richmond, Staten Island, New York. Designed by Pelcher and Zobel and constructed in 1907, its building was listed on the National Register of Historic Places in 2007. 
The domed, wooden, clapboard-sided synagogue, located in Staten Island is built in Classical style.  A pedimented front porch is supported by a pair of columns, a design that repeats inside in the design of the Torah Ark.  The modest building is topped by a dome that supports a Star of David.  The dome is supported by an octagonal drum.  The dome was originally painted gold and is said to have been visible from miles away.

External links
Temple Emanu-El website

References

Properties of religious function on the National Register of Historic Places in Staten Island
Synagogues in Staten Island
Conservative synagogues in New York City
Neoclassical synagogues
Synagogue buildings with domes
Synagogues on the National Register of Historic Places in New York City